The Motörhead 40th Anniversary Tour was a concert tour performed by the English heavy metal band in celebration of their 40th anniversary, as well as in support of their 22nd and final studio album, Bad Magic. It would be the band's final tour before the death of Lemmy on 28 December 2015.

Lemmy's undisclosed health issues resulted in several concerts being cancelled.  Nevertheless he continued to front Motörhead  until his final concert just two weeks before his death in Los Angeles. After Lemmy's doctor had given him between two and six months to live, he had been meaning to make his diagnosis public in early 2016 but he died before a press release could be released.

Background

Concerts
During the first leg of the tour, Motörhead had to curtail and cut several shows because of health issues. Beginning in Salt Lake City on 27 August 2015 (in the Rocky Mountains), Motörhead ended their performance early due to Lemmy's breathing problems (the result of an altitude sickness). They also had to cancel an appearance at Denver Riot Fest on 28 August 2015.

Their tour restarted on 1 September 2015 at Emo's in Austin, Texas (it was moved from the Cedar Park Center) but the band were again forced to abandon their set after three songs and cancel subsequent shows in Texas from the September 2015 to 5 September 2015. Despite these setbacks, Lemmy was able to return in time for the band's annual Motörboat heavy metal cruise from Miami to The Bahamas between the 28 September to 2 October 2015. Motörhead was joined by bands such as Slayer, Anthrax, Exodus, Suicidal Tendencies and Corrosion of Conformity.

The second leg of Motörhead's 40th Anniversary Tour began in Europe in November. The band played concerts in Germany, Sweden, Norway and Finland. However, their 15 November show at Zénith in Paris was postponed after the November 2015 Paris attacks. Two concerts on the 28th and 30th of November in Germany were also postponed due to guitarist Phil Campbell suddenly requiring hospitalisation. These two shows were then moved back to 9 and 11 December; these would become the last ever concerts played by Motörhead. Speaking after Lemmy's death, drummer Mikkey Dee said: "He was terribly gaunt. He spent all his energy on stage and afterwards he was very, very tired. It's incredible that he could even play, that he could finish the Europe tour. It was only 20 days ago. Unbelievable."

Opening acts 
 Saxon (North America, Europe)
 Crobot (North America)
 Anthrax (North America)
 Girlschool (Europe)

Setlist 
 "Bomber"
 "Stay Clean"
 "Metropolis"
 "When the Sky Comes Looking for You" (added on November 17)
 "Over the Top"
 Phil Campbell guitar solo
 "The Chase Is Better Than the Catch"
 "Rock It"
 "Lost Woman Blues"
 "Orgasmatron" (added on November 17)
 "Doctor Rock" with Mikkey Dee drum solo
 "Just 'Cos You Got the Power"
 "No Class"
 "Ace of Spades"
Encore
 "Whorehouse Blues" (added on November 17)
 "Overkill"

Other performed songs included
 "Going to Brazil"
 "Damage Case"
 "We Are Motörhead"
 "Shoot You In The Back"
 "Rosalie" (Thin Lizzy cover)

Tour dates

Personnel 
 Lemmy Kilmister – bass guitar, lead vocals, harmonica on "Whorehouse Blues"
 Phil Campbell – guitar
 Mikkey Dee – drums, guitar on "Whorehouse Blues"

References 

Motörhead concert tours
2015 concert tours